Mitrasen Thapa Magar (29 December 1895 – 7 April 1946), popularly known as Master Mitrasen, was a Nepali folk singer, songwriter, dramatist and social worker. He left army in early age for the upliftment of Nepalese music and society. His contribution to different fields of Nepalese society is remarkable.

Early life 
He was born in Bhagsu Cantonment, India on 29 December 1895 to father Manbirsen Thapa Magar and mother Radha Thapa Magar. His grand father was Surendrasen Thapa. His ancestral home was in Rakhu Pula village in Parbat District of Nepal. He had a son named Digvijay Sen Thapa.

Education
Since there was no school around Bhagsu Cantonment, during his time, he started learning from his father initially. He joined his first grade at his 8 years of age at a primary school five miles away from his residence. He learned the Ramayana translated by Bhanubhakta from his father.

Military service
When he became 16 years old, he joined 1/1 Gorkha Rifles as a recruit. His forefathers had served in same unit before. He took part in World War I with his battalion in France in 1914. He left military service in 1920. His interest was to be social worker and devote his rest of life for betterment of Nepalese music and society.

Music contributions

He travelled different parts of India as well as Nepal where Nepalese people lived with his harmonium. His folk songs became very popular among Nepalese people. He recorded 24 disk record or 97 songs in nepali music. He was not only singer, he equally contributed in the field of drama, story, novel, essay, poems etc. 

For his great contribution in Nepali society and music, India and Nepal governments have already published mailing tickets with his photographs. There is also Mitrasen Academy to promote Nepali music and society to follow and remember his legacy. His contributions made him as a Master Mitrasen and remained immortal.

References

Cited sources
Harsha Bahadur Budha Magar (1999) Master Mitrasen Thapa Magar. Kathmandu: Pushpavati Budha Magar

External links

Official website

Magar
Magar
1895 births
1946 deaths
20th-century Nepalese male singers
People from Dharamshala
Nepali-language singers from India